Keyshia Cole: The Way It Is is an American reality television series starring R&B singer Keyshia Cole, which aired on BET. The series was filmed in Atlanta, Georgia. The series became one of the most-watched programs in BET’s history.

Episodes

Season 1  
Humble Beginnings - The series begins in Keyshia's hometown Oakland, California. She visits her sister Neffe. Later, she throws a barbecue block party. She also makes an appearance on a radio talk show to address rumors.
If I Can You Can - Keyshia hits the road and goes to Las Vegas, Nevada. While there, she speaks with a group of troubled teens. She also throws a contest at a radio station to give one of her fans the chance to sing a duet with her.
Foundations for the Future - Keyshia states her intentions of starting her own record label. She expresses her interest in the undiscovered rapper, Amina. Later, she goes to record vocals for Diddy's album Press Play.
The Celebration - Keyshia discovers that her album went platinum and decides to throw a party to celebrate. She and her girls go shopping for something fly to wear. At the party, they all get red carpet treatment.
Waiting to Exhale - Keyshia's schedule is jammed and she needs a break so she decides to hire a personal assistant. She and Manny conduct interviews for the job. Later, Keyshia and her sister Neffe get into a huge argument after Neffe gets —— at dinner.
Mother Pearl - In the groundbreaking season finale, Keyshia decides to visit her estranged mother in jail. She and her mother, Frankie, haven't seen each other in a year, so the confrontation is anything but comfortable. Neffe also gets to see their mother.

Season 2 
Reunion - Keyshia's mother Frankie is released from prison and Keyshia tries to build a relationship with her.
Whatever It Takes - Keyshia, Neffe and Frankie attend a family therapy session to resolve issues of the past and present. Later, Frankie speaks to women who were victims of abuse.
No More Tears, Mama - No synopsis available.
Girlfriends - No synopsis available.
Why You Trippin' - No synopsis available.
Business & Pleasure - Keyshia prepares to launch her record label and clothing line and also searches for a home for her sister, Neffe, and her mother, Frankie. Later, Frankie and Neffe go on a double date. 
Love for the Kids - Keyshia and Neffe try to find their biological fathers in Oakland. Elsewhere, Manny is at home with the kids and he plans a surprise to gather all of Keyshia's brothers and sisters together.
We Ain't Family! - No synopsis available.
Black Family Reunion (1) - The reunion begins when Manny locates Keyshia's brother. Keyshia surprises her mom and Neffe with their new home but everybody isn't satisfied.
The Breakdown - No synopsis available.
Black Family Reunion (2) - A guy claims to be Keyshia's father and a DNA test is given to see if he's telling the truth.
A Family Affair - The family reunites to discuss current developments and the birth of Neffe's baby.

Season 3 
Fresh Start - In the third-season premiere, Keyshia works with a life coach. Meanwhile, Frankie and Neffe clash over their new living arrangements.
Life Coach - No synopsis available. 
My Two Moms -Frankie struggles with guilt over giving Keyshia up for adoption.
Guilt-Ridden Moves - No synopsis available.
Let's Go to Church - Frankie and Yvonne go to church, where they each speak to the congregation. Elsewhere, Neffe thinks Frankie may have relapsed.
By Faith We Strive - Keyshia meets with a pastor for spiritual advice; Neffe and Frankie are still at odds over Frankie's boyfriend.
Family Feud - No synopsis available.
Family Vacation - Keyshia invites her family to Trinidad for a concert and vacation.
Learn for My Mistakes - Keyshia goes shopping with her niece, who's feeling nervous about attending private school. Later, Keyshia gives clothes to charity and takes her family to a water park.
A Time for Giving - No synopsis available.
Nothing but the Blood - Neffe prepares to baptize her son as she struggles with guilt about her past. Elsewhere, Keyshia works on her album in Los Angeles.
Full Circle - Keyshia visits a youth center to make a donation. Elsewhere, Neffe meets with Kevin, Jaylen's father, while visiting Oakland.
Transition in Action - Keyshia spends time with her family after finishing her album; Frankie surprises Neffe in their final therapy session; Neffe meets with Bishop Eddie Long.
New Beginnings - Neffe celebrates her birthday in Las Vegas in the third-season finale. Also: Frankie moves out.
New Beginnings II - No synopsis available.

References

External links 
 

BET original programming
Keyshia Cole
2000s American reality television series
2006 American television series debuts
2008 American television series endings
African-American reality television series
Television series based on singers and musicians